Grant Saacks is a South African former professional tennis player.

Born and raised in Cape Town, Saacks was a junior Wimbledon quarter-finalist and played collegiate tennis for Pepperdine University during the late 1980s.

While competing on the professional tour he reached a best singles world ranking of 427 and in 1988 made the main draw of a Grand Prix tournament in Indianapolis, where he lost his first round match in three sets to Jim Pugh.

Earlier in his career he had singles victories over Pete Sampras, Petr Korda and Wayne Ferreira.  He was a top 30 Men's player in France and ranked #23 Junior tennis player in the world.

Saacks has lived in New York City since 1999 and works in real estate.

References

External links
 
 

Year of birth missing (living people)
Living people
South African male tennis players
Pepperdine Waves men's tennis players
Sportspeople from Cape Town
South African emigrants to the United States